Gastrotheca abdita is a species of frog in the family Hemiphractidae. It is endemic to Peru and only known from the Cordillera Colán in the Amazonas Region. The specific name abdita is Latin for "exiled" or "removed" and refers to the geographic isolation of the Cordillera Colán. Common name Cordillera Colan marsupial frog has been coined for it.

Description
The head is slightly wider than it is long. The snout is acuminate in dorsal view and bluntly rounded in profile. The tympanum is brown and distinct, covered by the supra-tympanic fold in its upper part. The fingers have no webbing but bear discs that are much wider than the digits. The toes are about one-fourth webbed and bear discs that are slightly smaller than the finger discs. The dorsum is in most individuals uniform brown, but some have a paler mid-dorsal mark. Skin is smooth dorsally and granular on flanks, belly, and proximal postero-ventral surfaces of the thighs.

Habitat and conservation
Gastrotheca abdita is a terrestrial species occurring in grassy areas, bogs, and the fronds of terrestrial bromeliads at elevations of  asl, above the treeline. No major threats to this little-studied species are known. It occurs in the Cordillera de Colán National Sanctuary.

References

abdita
Frogs of South America
Amphibians of the Andes
Amphibians of Peru
Endemic fauna of Peru
Taxa named by William Edward Duellman
Amphibians described in 1987
Taxonomy articles created by Polbot